Philip de Lalaing (Lallaing, 1537 – Mons, 24 May 1582) was 3rd Count of Lalaing and Lord of Escornaix and Wavrin.

He was the eldest son of Charles II de Lalaing and Margaret of Croÿ (died 1549).
In 1574, at the beginning of the Eighty Years' War, he became stadtholder of Hainaut. First, he was loyal to the Spanish King, but in 1576 he supported the States-General of the Netherlands and the Union of Brussels (1577).
That year, Philip became commander in chief of the army of the States-General, but was decisively defeated in the Battle of Gembloux (1578). He was held responsible for the defeat by the Protestants, though he was not actually present at the battle. This and other disputes with the rebels made him sign Hainaut into the Union of Arras (January 1579), and reconcile himself with the King of Spain, under certain conditions. Philip served his King loyally the rest of his life.

Philip married Margaret of Ligne, daughter of Jean de Ligne, Duke of Arenberg. They only had one daughter, Margaret of  Lalaing, who married with Florent of Berlaymont. Berlaymont inherited all Philip's titles.

References

1537 births
1582 deaths
County of Hainaut
Dutch stadtholders
People of the Habsburg Netherlands
Ph